The 2015 Lorraine Open 88 was a professional tennis tournament played on outdoor clay courts. It was the ninth edition of the tournament and part of the 2015 ITF Women's Circuit, offering a total of $100,000 in prize money. It took place in Contrexéville, France, on 6–12 June 2015.

Singles main draw entrants

Seeds 

 1 Rankings as of 29 June 2015

Other entrants 
The following players received wildcards into the singles main draw:
  Fiona Ferro
  Jeļena Ostapenko
  Chloé Paquet
  Constance Sibille

The following players received entry from the qualifying draw:
  Georgina García Pérez
  Lara Michel
  Natalia Vikhlyantseva
  Nina Zander

The following player received entry by lucky loser spots:
  Gaia Sanesi
  Rebecca Šramková
  Carla Touly

Champions

Singles

 Alexandra Dulgheru def.  Yulia Putintseva, 6–3, 1–6, 7–5

Doubles

 Oksana Kalashnikova /  Danka Kovinić def.  Irina Ramialison /  Constance Sibille, 2–6, 6–3, [10–6]

External links 
 2015 Lorraine Open 88 at ITFtennis.com
 Official website 

2015 ITF Women's Circuit
2015
2015 in French tennis